New Pokémon Snap is an on-rails first-person photography game developed by Bandai Namco Studios and published by Nintendo and The Pokémon Company for the Nintendo Switch. It is a sequel to the 1999 Nintendo 64 game Pokémon Snap. Announced in June 2020, it was released on April 30, 2021. Players travel in the Lental region using an on-rails hovercraft and research Pokémon by photographing them.

Gameplay is similar to its Nintendo 64 predecessor, with the return of its island setting, the on-rails photography mechanic, unlockable stages, real-time interaction with the environment via unlockable items, and the ability to save photographs for later viewing. New Pokémon Snap'''s protagonist is guided by the Pokémon researcher Professor Mirror, who takes on the Professor Oak role from the first installment. Professor Mirror, who is joined by his assistants, offers not only the entire island for photography exploration, but also his research lab itself as an unlockable course.

New to this installment is the option to view courses at different stages of day, such as daytime and nighttime, which offer the player chances to capture different Pokémon and poses not offered in the standard course runs. The player can also access "Illumia" stages that allow the player to capture photos of Pokémon in their Illumia form, a new feature unique to Snap. Pokémon photo scores have also been expanded upon, with letter rankings added for an additional challenge. Certain courses may only be unlocked by achieving a baseline score, and capturing Pokémon in specific poses, recorded in a journal, results in additional bonuses.

 Plot 
The game follows the protagonist, as he helps Professor Mirror and his associates to uncover the secrets of the Lental region, which is famous for its phenomenon of luminescent Pokémon. Researching five legendary species protecting the islands, they find out that they are linked to a local legend. 2000 years ago, they protected the island from a meteor strike under the guidance of Xerneas, who gave them their powers.

 Gameplay 

In New Pokémon Snap, the player is a Pokémon photographer who visits various islands in the Lental region to help the research studies of Professor Mirror and his assistants Rita and Phil. Todd from the original Pokémon Snap makes an appearance in this game. The research lab located in the Lental region is called the Laboratory of Ecological and Natural Sciences (L.E.N.S.). Taking photographs helps the player build a compendium called a Photodex; the game features over 200 different Pokémon for the player to photograph. In addition to adding photos to the Photodex, the player also helps investigate the Illumina phenomenon, where Pokémon and plants appear to have a special glow.

For each research expedition, the player travels in an on-rails hovercraft, the NEO-ONE (an updated version of the ZERO-ONE from Pokémon Snap), to safely photograph Pokémon in their natural environments. With the new content update, aside from being able to travel underwater and faster, the NEO-ONE is capable of shrinking, along with its occupants. These habitats include jungles, deserts and beaches, which can be visited during daytime or at night in order to photograph different types of Pokémon. Each photo the player takes is graded by Professor Mirror on a scale of one to four stars based on how rare the current activity of the Pokémon is. Each photo is also given a score taking into account things like shot composition, how close the Pokémon is, and whether they are facing the camera or not. Players can decide to save those photos to the Photodex, which can hold up to four photos of each Pokémon (one at each rating). As players take higher-quality photos, they earn Expedition Points that go toward improving the Research Level of each area in the Lental region. Achieving higher research levels will open up more levels to explore in that area.

To get better pictures, the player is encouraged to use various tools to coax out rarely-seen Pokémon reactions on camera. To lure Pokémon out, players can use a fruit called a fluffruit, or play a melody that can get some Pokémon to dance. They can also throw an item called an Illumina Orb to cause Pokémon to glow. The orbs serve to not only help the player take pictures at night, but also potentially change a Pokémon's behavior. Depending on the Pokémon, the Illumina orb can help wake up sleeping creatures, or even sometimes cheer them up. Players can find hidden Pokémon in the area by using their camera to scan for them.

After Professor Mirror grades the player's photographs, players can retouch their photos using the Re-Snap feature. This allows the player to change parameters like zoom, blur, and brightness, as well as add photographic filters, photo frames, and stickers. These edited photos can be saved to a personal photo album separate from the Photodex. Players can upload their photos online to share with other players, who in turn can help get their favourite photos be featured in-game by liking them, known as giving Sweet! Medals.

 Development New Pokémon Snap was developed by Bandai Namco Studios and published by The Pokémon Company and Nintendo. Bandai Namco had previously developed the Pokémon fighting game Pokkén Tournament, in which Pokémon were depicted as part of an interconnected world, coexisting with humans. According to game director Haruki Suzaki, who directed both titles, it was this depiction of Pokémon that helped the studio earn the opportunity to work on New Pokémon Snap.

Suzaki's vision for the game was to keep the basic gameplay from the original, while adding new features that reflected how people currently interact with photographs. He explained, "The result is a simple game of taking pictures in a world where Pokémon are alive and well in nature, but at the same time there is a variety of contemporary ways to play with photography."

It was announced during the Pokémon Presents presentation on June 17, 2020, and was released on April 30, 2021, for the Nintendo Switch.

An update released on August 3, 2021, adds three new areas to explore and 20 more Pokémon.

 Release and promotion New Pokémon Snap was released on April 30, 2021, in North America and Japan, about 22 years after the release of the original Pokemon Snap.

To promote the game, Nintendo announced company collaborations. A Pokémon Go in-game event, held from April 29 to May 2, featured Pokémon from the Lental region. Nintendo also worked with Fujifilm to introduce a mobile app on launch day that lets players use a Instax Mini Link printer to print out screenshots stored on the Nintendo Switch, including photos taken in New Pokémon Snap. Before printing, the app allows users to decorate their photos with filters and photo frames inspired by the game, as well as from other games like the Mario franchise and Animal Crossing: New Horizons.

 Reception New Pokémon Snap received "generally positive reviews", according to the review aggregator Metacritic.

Awards and accolades
The game was nominated for Best Family Game at The Game Awards 2021.

 Sales New Pokémon Snap'' sold 194,385 physical copies within its first week on sale in Japan, making it the best-selling retail game of the week in the country. In the United Kingdom, it sold four times as many physical copies at launch as its predecessor game, also taking the number one place in sales. It had sold 2.07 million copies by June 30, 2021. It had sold 2.4 million copies as of December 2021.

Notes

References

External links 
 

2021 video games
Nintendo Switch games
Nintendo Switch-only games
Pokémon spin-off games
Bandai Namco games
Photography games
Video game sequels
Video games developed in Japan
Video games featuring protagonists of selectable gender
Video games set on fictional islands
Video games about size change
Rail shooters